Conway Methodist Church, 1898 and 1910 Sanctuaries, also known as First United Methodist Church, is a historic Methodist church located at Conway in Horry County, South Carolina. The 1898 sanctuary is a one-story, brick, cruciform, cross-gable roofed, Gothic Revival style building. It features Tudor arched stained glass lancet windows. The 1910 sanctuary is a Mission Revival style building and is a large one-story, front-gabled roof, stuccoed building. It features two square bell towers.

It was listed on the National Register of Historic Places in 1986.

Gallery

References

External links
Conway Methodist Church, 1898 and 1910 Sanctuaries - Conway, South Carolina - U.S. National Register of Historic Places on Waymarking.com
First United Methodist Church of Conway, South Carolina website

Churches on the National Register of Historic Places in South Carolina
Gothic Revival church buildings in South Carolina
Mission Revival architecture in South Carolina
United Methodist churches in South Carolina
Churches completed in 1898
19th-century Methodist church buildings in the United States
Churches completed in 1910
20th-century Methodist church buildings in the United States
Churches in Horry County, South Carolina
National Register of Historic Places in Horry County, South Carolina
Buildings and structures in Conway, South Carolina
1898 establishments in South Carolina